Fairmead is a census-designated place in Madera County, California, United States. The population was 1,235 at the 2020 census.

A post office operated at Fairmead from 1913 to 1940. The community is impacted by the California High-Speed Rail, as the planned route will dislocate residents.

Demographics

At the 2010 census Fairmead had a population of 1,447. The racial makeup of Fairmead was 764 (52.8%) White, 88 (6.1%) African American, 23 (1.6%) Native American, 7 (0.5%) Asian, 0 (0.0%) Pacific Islander, 497 (34.3%) from other races, and 68 (4.7%) from two or more races. Hispanic or Latino of any race were 984 people (68.0%).

The whole population lived in households, no one lived in non-institutionalized group quarters and no one was institutionalized.

There were 360 households, 192 (53.3%) had children under the age of 18 living in them, 216 (60.0%) were opposite-sex married couples living together, 55 (15.3%) had a female householder with no husband present, 24 (6.7%) had a male householder with no wife present.  There were 29 (8.1%) unmarried opposite-sex partnerships, and 0 (0%) same-sex married couples or partnerships. 49 households (13.6%) were one person and 20 (5.6%) had someone living alone who was 65 or older. The average household size was 4.02.  There were 295 families (81.9% of households); the average family size was 4.34.

The age distribution was 496 people (34.3%) under the age of 18, 163 people (11.3%) aged 18 to 24, 371 people (25.6%) aged 25 to 44, 311 people (21.5%) aged 45 to 64, and 106 people (7.3%) who were 65 or older.  The median age was 29.0 years. For every 100 females, there were 112.5 males.  For every 100 females age 18 and over, there were 109.0 males.

There were 404 housing units at an average density of 48.3 per square mile, of the occupied units 205 (56.9%) were owner-occupied and 155 (43.1%) were rented. The homeowner vacancy rate was 2.4%; the rental vacancy rate was 8.3%.  770 people (53.2% of the population) lived in owner-occupied housing units and 677 people (46.8%) lived in rental housing units.

Education
Chowchilla School District and Chowchilla Union High School District serve residents of the community.

Notable people
Bob Helm, jazz clarinetist

References

Census-designated places in Madera County, California
Census-designated places in California